During the 1987–88 season, Newcastle United participated in the Football League First Division. Following the sale of star player Peter Beardsley to Liverpool for a club record fee of £1.9 million, manager Willie McFaul recruited Brazilian international Mirandinha to replace Beardsley. With the Brazilian joining Goddard and Paul Gascoigne, the team managed a mediocre start to the season. Midfielder Glyn Hodges arrived from Wimbledon but only managed seven games in his 86-day stay, before heading back south. McFaul signed young Irishman Michael O'Neill in the winter; hailed as a new George Best by some, the 18 year old went on an amazing run of 12 goals in 19 games that saw Newcastle finish 8th, their highest finish since being promoted back to the top flight.

Kit
English company Umbro remained Newcastle United's kit manufacturers for the eighth consecutive season, and introduced a new kit for the season. Greenall's Beers remained kit sponsors, although the "Beers" was dropped from the kit sponsorship.

Appearances, goals and cards
(Substitute appearances in brackets)

Coaching staff

Transfers

In

Out

Total spending:  £30,000

External links
Newcastle United Football Club - Fixtures 1987-88
Season Details - 1987-88 - toon1892

References

Newcastle United F.C. seasons
Newcastle United